Jon Phillip (born May 18, 1979 in Kenosha, Wisconsin, United States) is an American musician, sober living enthusiast, and record collector.  He currently lives in Nashville, Tennessee and is the drummer for Josh Berwanger of the Anniversary and frontman of Mini Meltdowns.  From 2010-2015, Phillip spent time recording and touring with Tommy Stinson, the Paul Collins Beat, and Trapper Schoepp & The Shades.  He spent much of the mid-2000s playing drums for the now-defunct California-based twangy rock band Limbeck.  He has also played in Drive-Thru Records' power-pop band The Benjamins, The Obsoletes, Ben Weasel & His Carnegie Bandsmen, Shaft, and a punk band in high school called Tralfez.

Phillip was nominated for the Wisconsin Area Music Industry (WAMI) award for 2012 Drummer of the Year, but lost to the drummer of the award show's house band.  Investigation is underway.

While living in Milwaukee, Wisconsin, he co-founded Good Land Records in late 2010.

Phillip played drums for Josh Berwanger on a Midwest tour in Spring 2014.  In June, September, and October 2014, he toured the U.S. with the Paul Collins Beat.  In January 2015, he joined Trapper Schoepp & The Shades on drums for a west coast tour opening for The Jayhawks.

In late 2017, Phillip started Mini Meltdowns, a punk band featuring himself and Scott Schoenbeck from Dashboard Confessional, and The Promise Ring.  The band's self-titled 7" was released on April 20, 2018, on Good Land Records.  The band features Phillip on guitar and lead vocals for the first time, as well as drumming duties.

Discography
 The Benjamins •  Bordering on Boredom EP • self-released • 1999
 The Benjamins •  The Art of Disappointment • Drive-Thru Records • 2001
 Limbeck • Hey, Everything's Fine. • Doghouse Records • 2003
 Obsoletes • Is This Progress? • 1-4-5 Records  • 2004
 Nob Dylan & His Nobsoletes • 12 Positively Stiff Dylans • Alternative Tentacles • 2005
 Limbeck • Limbeck • Doghouse Records • 2007
 Ben Weasel • The Brain That Wouldn't Die • Asian Man Records • 2009
 Trapper Schoepp & The Shades • Run, Engine, Run • (SideOneDummy Records • Good Land Records) • 2012
 Limbeck • Already Gone b/w Skyway 7" (SideOneDummy Records • Good Land Records) • 2012
 Frankie Lee • "Times Like This" from Rockin' Here Tonight, the Songs For Slim CD/LP compilation • New West Records • 2013
 Limbeck • "Sound Of Running" from While No One Was Looking, Toasting 20 Years of Bloodshot Records CD/LP compilation • Bloodshot Records • 2013
 The Benjamins • Back on Track EP • Good Land Records • 2014 
 Dwight Twilley/Josh Berwanger • Shooting Stars b/w Some Other Guy 7" • Good Land Records • 2015
 Trolley • Caught In The Darkness • Easter Records • Sugarbush Records •2016 
 Trapper Schoepp • Rangers & Valentines • Xtra Mile Recordings • 2016
 The Anniversary • Exorcism Rock  • Doghouse Records • 2016 
 The Anniversary • The Star Invaders  • Good Land Records • 2017 
 Mini Meltdowns • Mini Meltdowns 7" • Good Land Records • 2018
 The Anniversary/Casey James Prestwood • Cities b/w A New Kind of Love 7" • Lost Broadcast Records • 2019 
 Cabin Essence • For Your Love b/w No More 7" • Good Land Records • 2019
 The Anniversary • Watching A Garden Die  • Wiretap Records • 2019 
 Mini Meltdowns • Destined For Disaster EP • Good Land Records • 2019
 Tracing Mona • Happy In the Saddest Way • Good Land Records • 2020

References

1979 births
Living people
American rock drummers
American rock guitarists
American rock singers
Record producers from Wisconsin
Musicians from Kenosha, Wisconsin